Jhula  is a village development committee in Western Rukum District in Karnali Province of western Nepal. At the time of the 2011 Nepal census it had a population of 3334 people living in 686 individual households.

Jhula or, Jhula-pul, also translates into "bridge" or "suspension bridge" in Hindi language. (2)

2 examples would include the "Lakshman Jhula" bridge and the "Ram Jhula" bridge - both in Rishikesh, India

References
2: Jhula-pul Meaning in English

Populated places in Western Rukum District